Japie Nel (born 20 November 1982 in Welkom, South Africa) is a South African rugby union player who last played for the  in the Currie Cup. His regular position is centre.

Nel made in excess of one hundred career appearances.

Career

Griffons

Nel played club rugby for Welkom Rovers in 2004 and 2005. This led to his inclusion in their squad for the 2005 Currie Cup competition and he made his first class debut for them in a qualifying round match against . He was also named the Griffons Back of the Year for 2007.

Leopards

Nel only made four appearances during that competition, but remained a regular in their Vodacom Cup side.

Return to Griffons

In total, Nel played in excess of fifty matches for them during his second spell, averaging about one try every two matches.

He was also a key member of their 2014 Currie Cup First Division-winning side. He played in the final and helped the Griffons win the match 23–21 to win their first trophy for six years.

References

1982 births
Living people
Griffons (rugby union) players
Leopards (rugby union) players
Rugby union centres
Rugby union players from Welkom
South African rugby union players